Alon Orlitsky is an information theorist and the Qualcomm Professor for Information Theory and its Applications at University of California, San Diego. He received a BSc in Mathematics and Electrical Engineering from Ben Gurion University in 1981, and a PhD in Electrical Engineering from Stanford University in 1986. He was a member of Bell Labs from 1986 to 1996, and worked for D. E. Shaw from 1996 to 1997. He joined UCSD in 1997.

He is known for his contribution to the fields of communication complexity, source coding, and more recently in probability estimation. He is a recipient of the IEEE W.R.G. Baker Award in 1992, the IEEE Information Theory Society paper award in 2006, a best paper award at NeurIPS in 2015, and a best paper honorable mention at International Conference on Machine Learning in 2017, and the 2021 Claude E. Shannon Award of IEEE Information Theory Society.

References

Living people
Year of birth missing (living people)
American information theorists
University of California, San Diego faculty